Lake Dahlgren is a  lake situated approximately  southeast of Noble, Oklahoma. It is an artificial lake created by the Oklahoma Department of Wildlife Conservation in 1953. There are no picnic, camping or bathroom facilities at Lake Dahlgren. However, the lake remains popular due to the numerous hiking trails located nearby.

Notes

Bodies of water of Cleveland County, Oklahoma
Dahlgren
Tourist attractions in Cleveland County, Oklahoma